The Murder Clinic is a 1966 horror giallo film directed by Lionello De Felice and Elio Scardamaglia. It was produced by Elio Scardamaglia, Francesco Scardamaglia and Luciano Martino;. The screenplay was written by Martino and Ernesto Gastaldi from their own story. It stars William Berger, Françoise Prévost, Harriet White Medin, Mary Young and Barbara Wilson.

Plot 
In 1870s England, the director of a mental hospital (Berger) is secretly carrying out skin grafts on the patients in an attempt to restore his sister-in-law's mutilated face (it seems she accidentally fell into a lime pit). Meanwhile, a hooded killer is murdering people with a straight razor in the hospital.

Cast 
 William Berger as Dr. Vance
 Françoise Prévost as Gisele
 Mary Young as  Lisbeth
 Barbara Wilson as Mary 
 Germano Longo as  Ivan
 Philippe Hersent as Fred
 Harriet White (aka Harriet Medin) as Sheena
 Massimo Righi as Fred 
 Anna Maria Polani as Jane
 Delfi Mauro as Laura

Production
The film was shot in Villa Parisi in Rome. Although most sources indicate producer Elio Scardamaglia was also the director of the film, screenwriter Ernesto Gastaldi stated that De Felice was actually the film's director. Gastaldi stated that De Felice left the production near the end of shooting with only a few scenes remaining left for Scardamaglia to direct himself. It was shot by Marcello Masciocchi and edited by Alberto Gallitti. The music was composed by Francesco De Masi

Style
Roberto Curti, author of Italian Gothic Horror Films, 1957-1969, described The Murder Clinic as an example of the way Italian gothic horror films evolved into the giallo genre in the 1970s.

Release
Murder Clinic was released in Italy on March 17, 1966, distributed by Regional, at a length of 90 minutes. The film grossed a total of £96 million Italian lira on its theatrical release. In 1971, a re-release poster played off of Berger's own trouble with the law with the tag line "William Berger, guilty or innocent?" It was released in France as Les nuits de l'epouvante.

The film was released in the United States first as The Murder Clinic, and then years later, in an attempt to promote the film as a zombie movie, as Revenge of the Living Dead.

The film was released on DVD by Code Red DVD as part of the Six-Pack Volume Two box set.

Reception
From a contemporary review, "Byro." of Variety reviewed an 86 minute English dubbed version of the film, described the film as being typical of Italy's "continual supply of Gothic horror mysteries." "Byro." found the film "not up to some of the pix of Riccardo Freda or Mario Bava" but " noting its strength in its photography and visual look but that "the direction and scripting itself in on an inevitably elementary level, and the few attempts at "horror" via closups of Delphi Maurin's acid-disfigured face come off crudely."

In a retrospective review, Curti described the films direction as being "nondescript" and that the many red herrings in the film were unconvincing. Curti also noted, "The film only comes alive when Françoise Prévost is on screen". In his book Italian Horror Film Directors, Louis Paul described the film as a "handsomely crafted gothic thriller".

See also
French films of 1966
Italian films of 1966
List of horror films of 1966

References

Footnotes

Sources

External links 
 

1966 horror films
1966 films
Italian horror thriller films
Giallo films
French horror thriller films
Films scored by Francesco De Masi
Films set in the 1870s
Films set in Norfolk
Films shot in Rome
Films with screenplays by Ernesto Gastaldi
1960s slasher films
1960s Italian-language films
1960s Italian films
1960s French films